Sumenep Waterfall is a three-tiered waterfall in Jepara, located in the province of Central Java, Indonesia.

Location
Sumenep Waterfall is located 7 km southward of the hall of Jepara Regency.

Description
Sumenep Waterfall consists of three tiers:
 First tier Waterfall
At the bottom is a stone wall with three waterfalls.
 Second Tier Waterfall
The second tier, a 10-minute walk from the first, consists of a semicircular stone wall with three streams that spread across decorated hanging roots, moss, and green grass. 
 Third Tier Waterfall
The top tier consists of two large streams and waterfalls.

References

Tourism in Jepara
Waterfalls of Java
Landforms of Central Java